Mrinmayee Godbole is an Indian actress who appears in Marathi movies. She is most appreciated for her role in the Marathi film Chi Va Chi Sau Ka directed by Paresh Mokashi.

Career 
Godbole started her career with the Marathi movie Rajwade and Sons. She later played roles in other movies like Chintoo and Chi Va Chi Sau Ka. She played the lead actress in the latter film, of a vegan veterinarian, for which she learned kung fu.

Film
 Teecha Baap Tyacha Baap (2011)
 Chintoo (2012)
 Rajwade and Sons (2015)
 Vees Mhanje Vees (2015)
 CRD (2016)
 Chi Va Chi Sau Ka (2017) 
 Dear Molly (2018)
 Pad Man (2018)
 Ye Re Ye Re Paisa 2 (2019)
Awwanchit (2021)

 Jhimma (2021)
 Vishwanath (2021)
 Dear Molly (2022)

Web series
Once A Year on MX Player (2019)
High on MX Player (2020)
Farzi on Amazon Prime Video (2023)

References 

Living people
Indian film actresses
Actresses from Pune
21st-century Indian actresses
Marathi actors
Actresses in Marathi cinema
Actresses in Marathi television
Year of birth missing (living people)